The splenius cervicis (also known as the splenius colli) is a muscle in the back of the neck. It arises by a narrow tendinous band from the spinous processes of the third to the sixth thoracic vertebrae; it is inserted, by tendinous fasciculi, into the posterior tubercles of the transverse processes of the upper two or three cervical vertebrae.

Its name is based on the Greek word σπληνίον, splenion (meaning a bandage) and the Latin word cervix (meaning a neck). The word collum also refers to the neck in Latin.

The function of the splenius cervicis muscle is extension of the cervical spine, rotation to the ipsilateral side and lateral flexion to the ipsilateral side.

Additional images

References

External links

 PTCentral

Muscles of the torso